Krasin is a Russian male surname; its feminine counterpart is Krasina. Notable people with the surname include:

 Boris Krasin (1884–1936), Russian musician
 Leonid Krasin (1870–1926), Russian politician and diplomat
 Victor Krasin (born 1929), Russian human-rights activist, economist, and political prisoner